Dichordophora is a genus of moths in the family Geometridae first described by Louis Beethoven Prout in 1913. It is the only genus in the tribe Dichordophorini.

Species
 Dichordophora aplagaria Dyar
 Dichordophora phoenix (Prout, 1912)

References

Geometrinae